Sheykhlar-e Sofla may refer to:
 Sheykhlar-e Sofla, East Azerbaijan
 Sheykhlar-e Sofla, Golestan